is a private university in Matsuyama, Ehime, Japan. It was established first as a women's junior college in 1966 and became a women's four-year university in 1988. It became a co-educational university in 2004. St. Catherine Junior College is attached to the university.

Organization
Department of Social Work
Department of Health and Welfare Management
Department of Human and Social Sciences

In addition, St. Catherine Junior College's Department of Early Childhood Education and Care awards licenses and certifications to become a pre-school teacher, a nursery school teacher, a recreation instructor, or a social work officer.

References

External links
Official website 
Official website 

Educational institutions established in 1966
Private universities and colleges in Japan
Universities and colleges in Ehime Prefecture
1966 establishments in Japan
Catholic universities and colleges in Japan
Matsuyama, Ehime